Necron is the title character of an Italian humorous-horror adult comics miniseries published between 1981 and 1985.

Publication history 
Necron debuted in January 1981, published by editor Edifumetto; the authors, writer Mirka Martini and illustrator Roberto Raviola, signed the comics with the pen names Ilaria Volpe and Magnus. Necron was initially intended to be a single episode, but the publisher convinced the authors to make a whole miniseries. The series closed after 11 episodes in November 1981, then the character returned in a twelfth out of series episode in 1983, and finally in two special issues in June 1985.  During the years, the series was republished and several anthologic books were released.

Plot and style 
The comic, a sexy-parody of Frankenstein,  features the adventures of the nymphomaniac and necrophiliac mad doctor Frieda Boher and of her slave-lover Necron, a strong, well endowed and cannibal humanoid assembled with fragments of corpses.

The series was critically appreciated for its visual style, different from the previous works of Magnus, here characterized for a more clean and elegant pencil mark, so to be paired to the Franco-Belgian ″ligne claire″.

References 

Italian comics titles
Comics characters introduced in 1981
Italian comics characters
1981 comics debuts
1985 comics endings
Erotic comics
Horror comics
Comics based on Frankenstein
Fictional humanoids
Male characters in comics